The mid-mountain berrypecker or lemon-breasted berrypecker (Melanocharis longicauda) is a species of bird in the family Melanocharitidae.
It is found in Indonesia and Papua New Guinea.
Its natural habitats are subtropical or tropical moist lowland forest and subtropical or tropical moist montane forest.

References

mid-mountain berrypecker
Birds of New Guinea
mid-mountain berrypecker
Taxonomy articles created by Polbot